Wind Lion Plaza is a shopping center in Jinhu Township, Kinmen County, Republic of China (Taiwan) that opened on April 23, 2014. Jointly developed by Taiwan Land Development Corporation and Yoshimoto Kogyo, it is the largest shopping mall in the county. The mall is located in close proximity to Kinmen Airport.

Facilities
The shopping mall is divided into three areas: north, west and south.

See also
 List of tourist attractions in Taiwan

References

External links

2014 establishments in Taiwan
Buildings and structures in Kinmen County
Jinhu Township
Shopping malls established in 2014
Shopping malls in Taiwan
Tourist attractions in Kinmen County